Oduro Ofrikyi (born 6 October 1947) is a Ghanaian politician and a member of the first parliament of the fourth republic representing the Bekwai constituency in the Ashanti Region of Ghana. He is represented the constituency on the ticket of the National Democratic Congress.

Early life and education
Oduro Ofrikyi was born on 6 October 1947 at Dominase in the Ashanti Region of Ghana. He attended the SDA Training College, Agona and the University of Cape Coast, where he obtained his Bachelor of Arts degree in Education.

Politics
Ofrikyi was elected into parliament on the ticket of the National Democratic Congress during the December 1992 Ghanaian parliamentary election for the Bekwai Constituency in the Ashanti Region of Ghana. He was succeeded by Alexander Agyei-Acheampong of the New Patriotic Party who in the 1996 general election, polled 28,313 votes out of the total valid votes cast representing 63.10% against Kwaku Poku-Agyeman of the National Democratic Congress (who defeated him in the primaries) who polled 7,301 votes representing 16.30%.

Career
He is a teacher by profession and a former member of parliament for the Bekwai Constituency in the Ashanti Region of Ghana. He served one term as a parliamentarian for the Bekwai Constituency.

Personal life
He is a Christian.

References

Living people
1947 births
Ghanaian MPs 1993–1997
University of Cape Coast alumni
Ghanaian educators
National Democratic Congress (Ghana) politicians
People from Ashanti Region
21st-century Ghanaian politicians